Pedro Cerezo Galán (born 14 February 1935, Hinojosa del Duque) is a Spanish philosopher and university professor. His specialty is contemporary Western philosophy, including modern Spanish thinkers such as José Ortega y Gasset, Xavier Zubiri and Antonio Machado.

Biography 
He graduated from the Universidad Complutense de Madrid in 1958, with a degree in philosophy and literature, and obtained his doctorate there three years later. His thesis on the concept of ousia in Aristotle was published as a book in 1962. This was followed by studies at the University of Freiburg and the University of Heidelberg. He was also a Fellow at the Spanish National Research Council, the Goethe-Institut and the Alexander von Humboldt Foundation.

In 1968, he became an associate professor of philosophy at the University of Barcelona then, two years later, obtained the chair of history and philosophy at the  University of Granada, where he remained until his retirement, serving as dean of the Faculty of Philosophy and letters. He is currently a Professor Emeritus.

In the general elections of 1982, he was chosen as a deputy, representing the District of Granada for the Spanish Socialist Workers' Party. From 1989 to 1991, he was a member of the advisory committee at the Juan March Foundation. In 2014, he was awarded the Menéndez Pelayo International Prize.

Selected writings 
 Palabra en el tiempo: Poesía y filosofía en Antonio Machado, Gredos, 1975 
 La voluntad de aventura: Aproximaciones críticas al pensamiento de Ortega y Gasset, Ariel, 1984 
 Las máscaras de lo trágico: Filosofía y tragedia en Miguel de Unamuno, Trotta, 1996 
 El mal del siglo. El conflicto entre Ilustración y Romanticismo en la crisis finisecular del siglo XIX, Biblioteca Nueva, 2004  
 Ética pública. Ethos civil, Biblioteca Nueva, 2010  
 José Ortega y Gasset y la razón práctica, Biblioteca Nueva, 2011

References

External links 
Writings by Cerezo @ Dialnet (University of La Rioja)

1935 births
Complutense University of Madrid alumni
Living people
Members of the 2nd Congress of Deputies (Spain)
Philosophy academics
Philosophy writers
Spanish scholars
Academic staff of the University of Granada